

This is a list of the National Register of Historic Places listings in Lewis County, Washington.

This is intended to be a complete list of the properties and districts on the National Register of Historic Places in Lewis County, Washington, United States. Latitude and longitude coordinates are provided for many National Register properties and districts; these locations may be seen together in a map.

There are 41 properties and districts listed on the National Register in the county. Another 2 properties were once listed but have been removed.

Current listings

|}

Former listings

|}

See also
 List of National Historic Landmarks in Washington
 National Register of Historic Places listings in Washington state

References

Lewis